The Hinckley 43 (Hood) is an American sailboat that was designed by Ted Hood and first built in 1976.

The design was originally marketed by the manufacturer as the Hinckley Hood 43 and later as just the Hinckley 43, but is now usually referred to as the Hinckley 43 (Hood) to differentiate it from the follow-on 1979 Hinckley 43 (Hood)-2 and the unrelated 1990 Hinckley 43 (McCurdy & Rhodes) design.

Production
The design was built by Hinckley Yachts in the United States, from 1976 until 1981, but it is now out of production.

Design
The Hinckley 43 (Hood) is a recreational keelboat, built predominantly of fiberglass, with wood trim. It has a masthead sloop rig; a raked stem; a raised counter, reverse transom, a skeg-mounted rudder controlled by a wheel and a fixed fin keel with a retractable centerboard. It displaces  and carries  of lead ballast.

The design has sleeping accommodation for eight people, with a double "V"-berth in the bow cabin, two straight settee berths and two pilot berths in the main cabin and two aft cabins with single berths. The galley is located on both sides, just forward of the companionway ladder. The galley is equipped with a three-burner stove, an ice box and a double sink. A navigation station is located on the port side. The head is located just aft of the bow cabin on the port side.

See also
List of sailing boat types

References

External links
Photo of a Hinckley 43 (Hood) sailing

Keelboats
1970s sailboat type designs
Sailing yachts
Sailboat type designs by Ted Hood
Sailboat types built by Hinckley Yachts